Finsbury is a district of London, England.

Finsbury may also refer to:
Metropolitan Borough of Finsbury, borough within London which existed from 1900 to 1965
Finsbury (UK Parliament constituency), constituency which existed from 1832 to 1885, and from 1918 to 1950
Finsbury Square
Finsbury division
Finsbury Dispensary
Finsbury Growth & Income Trust, investment fund in FTSE 250
Finsbury (public relations), UK company

See also
Finsbury Park, park in London
Finsbury Park (area), area of London